Pseudatelus is a genus of shield bugs of the family Pentatomidae. Currently placed in the tribe Halyini, McPherson's overview of the Pentatomoidea suggested it may be better placed into the Memmiini.

Description
Pseudatelus bugs range from  depending on the species. The bugs have a typical shield shape body. They are usually from brown to dark brown in colour, with triangular-shaped scutellum.

On female Pseudatelus bugs, the abdominal venter is almost entirely covered by a large, hair-covered opaque area. The long hairs on these areas may accumulate a waxy secretion.

Species

The genus contains the following species:
Pseudatelus latus
Pseudatelus limatus
Pseudatelus obscurus
Pseudatelus spinulosus (Palisot de Beauvois, 1807)
Pseudatelus sticticus

References

Pentatomidae genera
Halyini
Hemiptera of Africa